Nuno Miguel Valente Santos (born 2 March 1999) is a Portuguese professional footballer who plays as a midfielder for Major League Soccer club Charlotte FC.

Club career

Benfica
Born in Porto, Santos was a youth player at his city's two major teams, Boavista F.C. and FC Porto, before joining S.L. Benfica in 2012. He made his debut for the reserve team in LigaPro on 8 August 2017 as the season opened with a 2–1 away loss against U.D. Oliveirense, and scored his first goal the following 6 January at the end of a 3–1 defeat at FC Porto B. In 2018–19 he scored a career-best seven goals (adding five in seven matches in the UEFA Youth League), subsequently renewing his contract until 2024.

By then captain of Benfica B, Santos was loaned to Primeira Liga club Moreirense F.C. on 29 January 2020. He made his top-flight debut four days later by starting in a 5–1 away victory over Gil Vicente FC. His first goal at the level came on 11 July to win the game at Belenenses SAD.

Santos continued to be loaned the following two seasons, to Boavista and F.C. Paços de Ferreira. On 19 November 2021, while in service of the latter side, he put his team ahead against his parent club in the fourth round of the Taça de Portugal, but in a 4–1 loss.

Charlotte FC
On 5 August 2022, Santos signed a two-year deal with Charlotte FC in Major League Soccer.

International career
Santos was part of Hélio Sousa's Portugal under-19 team that won the 2018 UEFA European Championship in Finland. He made three substitute appearances in the tournament, including one in extra time of the final.

On 5 September 2019, Santos earned his first cap for the under-21s, in a 4–0 home defeat of Gibraltar in the 2021 UEFA European Championship qualifiers.

Honours
Benfica
Campeonato Nacional de Juniores: 2017–18
UEFA Youth League runner-up: 2016–17

Portugal
UEFA European Under-19 Championship: 2018

References

External links

1999 births
Living people
Portuguese footballers
Footballers from Porto
Association football midfielders
Primeira Liga players
Liga Portugal 2 players
Boavista F.C. players
FC Porto players
C.F. Os Belenenses players
S.L. Benfica B players
Moreirense F.C. players
F.C. Paços de Ferreira players
Major League Soccer players
Charlotte FC players
Portugal youth international footballers
Portugal under-21 international footballers
Portuguese expatriate footballers
Expatriate soccer players in the United States
Portuguese expatriate sportspeople in the United States